Harold of Orange is a short film/comedy directed by Richard Weise and produced by Dianne Brennan, with a screenplay by Gerald Vizenor.

Plot 

Tribal tricksters Harold Sinseer (Charlie Hill) and the Warriors of Orange, embark on a mission to give a proposal to the Bily foundation. Harold and company are looking to obtain a grant to produce miniature oranges and pinch beans. In the story, Harold's proposal is presented in a way that he states will "revolutionize the reservation way of life". Harold convinces both the Warriors of Orange and the foundation, that the miniature oranges and pinch beans will diminish alcoholism, spark political discussions and open the market for coffee shops across the reservation he lives.

Production 

The original screenplay done by Gerald Vizenor, is an example of Native American comedy  and examines different types of humor. There are three types of humor involved in both the screenplay and the film. Indians making fun of themselves, making fun of historical events and the most controversial, making fun of whites. Through subversive satire, Harold sheds light on the irony of the bureaucracy of business between whites and the Native people. The film also touches on key issues such as the treatment of Indian remains, the Bureau of Indian Affairs and how Native Americans and whites are viewed stereotypically. Through its humorous treatment, applied to both Indians' and whites' behavior motives, the film makes an unusual multifaceted comment on contemporary Native American life.

Cast 
The film cast includes:
 Charlie Hill
 Barbara Davidson
 Cathleen Fuller
 Michael Anthony Hall
 Bruce Murray
 James Noah
 Edward W. Noreen
 Deforest White Eagle
 Alan Woodward
 Neil Buckanaga
 William R. Laroque
 William Pensoneau

Personnel 
The personnel of the film are:
 Production Manager-Kirk Hokanson
 Casting Director- Sherry Virsen
 Production Sound Mixer- Matthew Quast
 Costumes- Sonya Berlovitz
 Make-up Advisor- Gary Boham
 Assistant Camera- Jerry Pope
 Field Production- Sheryl Mousley
 Set Decorator- Laila Schirrmeister
 Editing Assistant- Therese Kunz
 Location Scouts- David Dancyger/Curtis Wenzel
 Production Equipment- Lighthouse Inc.
 Music Recording Studio- The Village Recorder.

Soundtrack 
The film's soundtrack consists of the following tracks:

Funding 
The film received funding from the Northwest Area Foundation, National Endowment for the Arts, the Archie D. and Bertha B. Walker Foundation, and assistance from: The Sundance Institute.

References

External links 
 

American comedy short films
1984 comedy films
1984 short films
1984 films
1980s English-language films
1980s American films